Wang Tau Hom Estate is a public housing estate in Wang Tau Hom, Wong Tai Sin, Kowloon, Hong Kong, along Lung Cheung Road and next to Lok Fu. The estate was originally built in 1962 with a total of 25 blocks, but it was redeveloped between 1982 and 1983. It now consists of 18 blocks of three types, namely, Double H, Harmony 3 and Linear L with Linear 1 and Linear 3, providing a total of 5,900 domestic flats. There were originally six more blocks, but these were allocated to Lok Fu Estate because they were near MTR Lok Fu station after its 1991 construction.

Fu Keung Court, Ka Keung Court and Tak Keung Court are Home Ownership Scheme housing courts near Wang Tau Hom Estate. They have six, two and two blocks respectively, completed in 1991, 1998 and 2001 respectively.

Houses

Wang Tau Hom Estate

Fu Keung Court 

Fu Keung Court is in Primary One Admission (POA) School Net 43. Within the school net are multiple aided schools (operated independently but funded with government money) and Wong Tai Sin Government Primary School.

Ka Keung Court

Tak Keung Court

Demographics
According to the 2016 by-census, Wang Tau Hom Estate had a population of 17,116. The median age was 47.5 and the majority of residents (97 per cent) were of Chinese ethnicity. The average household size was three people. The median monthly household income of all households (i.e. including both economically active and inactive households) was HK$20,500.

See also
 List of public housing estates in Hong Kong
 Lok Fu Estate
 Public housing in Hong Kong

References

Residential buildings completed in 1962
Residential buildings completed in 1982
Residential buildings completed in 1983
Wang Tau Hom
Public housing estates in Hong Kong
1962 establishments in Hong Kong